Baiting is a blood sport where an animal is worried or tormented against another animal, for the purpose of entertainment or gambling.  This activity is illegal in most countries with varying levels of enforcement.

History 
During various periods of history and in different cultures around the world, various types of baiting, named for the species used, have been confirmed. These include badger-baiting, bear-baiting, bull-baiting, donkey-baiting, duck-baiting, hog-baiting, human-baiting, hyena-baiting, lion-baiting, monkey-baiting, rat-baiting, and wolf-baiting. Much of what is known about baiting comes from England in the Middle Ages, although it has not been legal there for some time. It is still practiced, however, in other parts of the world, including some cultures of Central Asia.

Restrictions

Political 
 South Sudan: The Criminal Code states that arranging, promoting or organizing fights between cocks, rams, bulls or other domestic animals, or encouraging such acts, shall be sentenced to imprisonment for a term not exceeding two months or with a fine, upon conviction.

See also 
 Cruelty to animals

References